The Caledonian Canal Act 1840 is an act of the British Parliament that was passed on 4 August of 1840 "to authorize the Commissioners of Her Majesty's Treasury"  to allow for the leasing and management of the Caledonian canal in Scotland.

The Caledonian Canal, which extends from Moray Firth to Loch Linnhe, was completed on 30 October 1822  and opened the same year.   An Act of Parliament establishing the Caledenian Canal Commissioners was passed on 27 July 1803, and the commissioners made a corporate body in 1848.  Both this canal and the Crinan Canal were subsequently privately leased in 1860.

References 

1840 in Scotland
Water transport in Scotland
United Kingdom Acts of Parliament 1840
Transport law in the United Kingdom
Acts of the Parliament of the United Kingdom concerning Scotland
History of transport in the United Kingdom
1840 in transport
Transport legislation